Sir Henry Wallop (18 October 1568 – 14 November 1642) of Farleigh House, Hampshire was an English politician who sat in the House of Commons  variously between 1597 and 1642.

Wallop was the eldest son of Sir Henry Wallop of Farleigh Wallop in Hampshire, vice-treasurer of Ireland, and his wife Katherine, daughter of Richard Gifford. He was educated at St John's College, Oxford, graduating BA in 1588. He acted as his father's deputy at Dublin, and was knighted there in August 1599.

Wallop was elected Member of Parliament for Lymington in 1597 and knight of the shire for Hampshire for the last parliament of Queen Elizabeth I in 1601. He was High Sheriff of Hampshire in 1603 and again in 1629, and High Sheriff of Shropshire in between February and November 1606. He was elected MP for Stockbridge in 1614, (although the election was subsequently voided), and was one of the council for the marches of Wales in 1617. In 1621 he was re-elected for Hampshire and in 1623 he was elected MP for Whitchurch. In 1624 became Custos Rotulorum of Hampshire, a post he held until his death. He was elected MP for  Andover in 1625 and in 1626 and 1628 was returned as MP for Hampshire.

Parliament was suspended for eleven years from 1629 and Wallop was obliged to serve a second term as High Sheriff of Hampshire the same year. In April 1640, he was again elected MP for Hampshire in the Short Parliament and in November 1640 for the Long Parliament. Wallop supported the Parliamentarian side but died at the age of 74 before he could take an active part in the Civil War.
 
He had married c.1596 Elizabeth Corbet, the daughter and heiress of Robert Corbet of Moreton Corbet, Shropshire, through whom he inherited Hopton Castle in Shropshire. Wallop left an only son, Robert Wallop who was also a Parliamentarian MP and had the Castle garrisoned for Parliament.

References

 
 
 
 
 
 
 

1568 births
1642 deaths
People from Farleigh Wallop
Henry
16th-century English people
High Sheriffs of Hampshire
High Sheriffs of Shropshire
Alumni of St John's College, Oxford
English MPs 1601
English MPs 1621–1622
English MPs 1624–1625
English MPs 1625
English MPs 1626
English MPs 1628–1629
English MPs 1640 (April)
English MPs 1640–1648
Knights Bachelor